Muthurajawela is a marsh in Sri Lanka in the southern region of the Negombo lagoon,  north of Colombo. The marsh is notable for its unique and highly diverse ecosystem and is listed as one of 12 priority wetlands in Sri Lanka. "Muthurajawela" translates to "Swamp of Royal Treasure".

The marsh is believed to have originated about 7,000 years ago. In 1996  of the northern part of the Muthurajawela marsh was declared a wetland sanctuary by the government, under the Flora and Fauna Protection Act, in recognition of its vast bio-diversity. The region supports 192 distinct species of flora and 209 distinct species of fauna, including Slender Loris, as well as another 102 species of birds.  Some of the identified species have been shown to be indigenous to the marsh.

The marsh is a major local and tourist attraction, primarily for sightseeing and boating tours, and the area also supports local agriculture and forestry.  Visitors to the region are guided through the sanctuary areas by the staff of the Muthurajawela Marsh Centre to avoid serious harm to the marsh ecosystem.

See also
 Kirala Kelle wetlands
 Diyasaru Park

References

Further reading
 

Wetlands of Sri Lanka